Luz Pavon is a fashion model born in Mexico. Models.com ranks her as one of the highest earners of the industry.

Career

Model career
Pavon is one of the most prominent mexican models, has appeared in advertisements for L’Oréal, Estée Lauder, Dior Makeup, MAC Cosmetics, Yves Saint Laurent, Balmain, Guess, Juicy Couture, GAP. She has been featured in numerous publications for Vogue, Teen Vogue, New York Times, Numéro, Harper's Bazaar, Wonderland, i-D magazine, Dazed & Confused, Vogue Italia, Esquire, Fashion TV and Fashionista.com. She has appeared in music videos for Kid Cudi and Joan Osborne. Pavon was selected by Chloë Sevigny to be part of her show in collaboration with Opening Ceremony and she also became VIP personality at the webshow series for Carolina Herrera 212 VIP fragrance.

Fashion business
At the end of 2008, Luz partnered with her sister and founded their own clothing company PAVON NYC. Their creation, called "The Ruffle Tube Dress" made in many different colors and textures, first sold to stylist Patricia Field from Sex and the City. It was featured as a must-have item in Style.com.
In 2011, MTV declared Pavon a rising star.

References

Living people
Mexican female models
Mexican fashion designers
Year of birth uncertain
Place of birth missing (living people)
Mexican women fashion designers
Year of birth missing (living people)